KNWS, known on-air as Faith 1090 KNWS, or by the network name Faith Radio, is a radio station in Waterloo, Iowa, owned and operated by University of Northwestern - St Paul and is a non-profit, listener-supported radio station relying on donations from the local community throughout the year.  It broadcasts on 1090 AM, covering Waterloo, Iowa and surrounding areas in eastern Iowa.  KNWS is licensed to broadcast during daylight hours only, but has an in-market translator located at 93.1 FM which airs a full 24-hour 7-day schedule.

Outside of station identification, it sources all programming from the Faith Radio network via satellite.

History

KNWS went on air in May 1947 as KAYX, owned by the Waterloo Broadcasting Company. The station became KBOK at April 27, 1950, with the new call letters making their on-air debut on May 8; at that time, Waterloo sought to move the station to 1280 kHz from a new tower site, but eventually requested that the construction permit be canceled.

In January 1953, it was announced that the Northwestern Schools would acquire KBOK, converting it to a noncommercial format and relocating its studios from downtown to the transmitter site. On April 1, 1953, Northwestern began operating the new KNWS, its first expansion outside of Minneapolis.

Translators

References

External links

FCC History Cards for KNWS

Waterloo, Iowa
NWS
Northwestern Media
NWS